The Battle of Loigny–Lumeau-Poupry was a battle of the Franco-Prussian War. It took place on 2 December 1870 during the Loire Campaign on a frontline between Loigny, Lumeau and Poupry.

After the Battle of Villepion, an army detachment (Armee-Abteilung) under the command of Friedrich Franz II, Grand Duke of Mecklenburg-Schwerin, engaged the French Army of the Loire and defeated them. The French force was led by General Antoine Chanzy (16th corps d'armée), supported in the afternoon by General Gaston de Sonis (17th corps d'armée).

The next day started the Second Battle of Orléans (1870).

Sources
Loigny–Poupry, Battle of

History of the Franco-Prussian War
 A Soldier's Message by DCN, Comet Press, 1958

External links

Loigny
Loigny
History of Eure-et-Loir
1870 in France
December 1870 events